The Monroe Invitational Championship is an annual amateur golf tournament in the United States, played since 1937 at Monroe Golf Club in Pittsford, New York, a suburb southeast of Rochester. Originally a match play event, it switched to 72-hole stroke play format in 1998.

The MIC is a "category B" tournament in the World Amateur Golf Ranking, meaning it is one of the top 100 men's amateur tournaments in the world.

The course at Monroe Golf Club opened in 1924 and was designed by Donald Ross.

Nick Palladino won the 2013 event in a playoff. Due to rain, the event had been shortened to 54 holes. Entering his senior year at the University of Rochester, Palladino became the first Division III player to win the event.

Winners

2022 Bartley Forrester
2021 C. J. Easley
2020 Canceled
2019 Andy Ogletree
2018 Kevin O'Connell
2017 Derek Bard
2016 Sean Crocker
2015 Adam Ball
2014 Taylor Pendrith
2013 Nick Palladino
2012 Thomas Pieters
2011 Albin Choi
2010 Kyle Peterman
2009 Bo Hoag
2008 Phillip Mollica
2007 Dustin Johnson
2006 Phillip Mollica
2005 Michael Sim
2004 Kyle Reifers
2003 Brent Delahoussaye
2002 D. J. Trahan
2001 Erik Compton
2000 Reg Millage
1999 Michael Morrison
1998 Bill Lunde
1997 Michael Boyd
1996 Jason Enloe
1995 Dan Stone
1994 Bud Still
1993 Tom Creavy
1992 Mike Emery
1991 Jean-Paul Hebert
1990 Bobby Gage
1989 Ryoken Kawagishi
1988 Chris DiMarco
1987 Nolan Henke
1986 Bob Friend
1985 John Kircher
1984 Bob Hughes
1983 Brian Kamm
1982 Dave Boeff
1981 Jeff Sluman
1980 Paul Bonacchi
1979 Mike Phillips
1978 Mike Mercier
1977 Chip Lillich
1976 Fred Ridley
1975 Rob Ladd
1974 Bill Gerber
1973 Mike Ford
1972 George Burns
1971 Terry Diehl
1970 Mickey Gallagher
1969 Terry Diehl
1968 Byron H. Morgan
1967 Carl DiCesare
1966 Don Allen
1965 Don Allen
1964 John Konsek
1963 C. Stewart Wallace
1962 James Campbell
1961 J. Peter Bush
1960 Jack Thornton
1959 John Konsek
1958 Warren Simmons
1957 Don Allen
1956 Frank Breslin
1955 Don Allen
1954 George Trainor
1953 Robert Hill
1952 Robert Hill
1951 Hank Wheat III
1950 Sam Urzetta
1949 Sam Urzetta
1948 Sam Urzetta
1947 Skee Riegel
1946 Pete Haas
1942–45 No tournament
1941 Cliff Goodrich
1940 George Trainor
1939 Arnold Zimmerman
1938 Jack Tucker
1937 Fred Allen

Multiple winners
Seven players have won more than one Monroe Invitational, through 2022:
4 wins: Don Allen
3 wins: Sam Urzetta
2 wins: Robert Hill, George Trainor, John Konsek, Terry Diehl, Phillip Mollica

References

External links

List of winners
Monroe Golf Club

Amateur golf tournaments in the United States
Golf in New York (state)
Sports in Rochester, New York
Recurring sporting events established in 1937
1937 establishments in New York (state)